Zhang Guanyao (1933 – 2002) was a Chinese translator and professor at Peking University. He was most notable for being one of the main translators into Chinese of the works of the French novelists Stendhal and Honoré de Balzac.

Biography
Zhang was born in 1933. In 1952 he was accepted to Peking University, where he graduated in 1956. After university, he taught there.

Translations
 The Red and the Black
 Biographies of Celebrities
 Père Goriot and Eugénie Grandet
 Bel-Ami

References

1933 births
2002 deaths
Peking University alumni
Academic staff of Peking University
French–Chinese translators
20th-century Chinese translators